Megachile walkeri is a species of bee in the family Megachilidae. It was described by Walker in 1871, and renamed by Dalla Torre in 1896.

References

walkeri
Insects described in 1871